The Glasgow City Region (previously Glasgow and Clyde Valley City Region, also known as Clydeside) is a somewhat urbanised city region in the western central belt of Scotland nestled in the Clyde Valley and consisting of the following eight councils: East Dunbartonshire, East Renfrewshire, Glasgow City Council, Inverclyde, North Lanarkshire, Renfrewshire, South Lanarkshire, and West Dunbartonshire. The councils, along with several others, had previously formed the Strathclyde region between 1974 and 1996.

Local government
The official region consists of the following councils:

References

Glasgow
Geography of Glasgow
City regions of Scotland
Greater Glasgow